Maxine Case (born January 17, 1976 in Cape Town) is a South African novelist, and short story writer.
Her debut novel, All We Have Left Unsaid, (Kwela Books, 2006) won the 2007 Commonwealth Writers’ Prize for Best First Book, Africa Region and was the joint winner of the Herman Charles Bosman Prize 2007.

She was a 2009 International Writing Program fellow at the University of Iowa and a writer in residence at the City of Asylum/Pittsburgh from November 2009 to February 2010.

Works
All We Have Left Unsaid, Kwela Books, 2006, 
  J. M. Coetzee (ed.) "Homing Pigeons", African Compass: New Writing from Southern Africa, New Africa Books, 2005, 
 Waarover we zwegen, Mistral Uitgevers, 2009,

References

External links
Maxine Case and Zuki Wanner Live Discussion, IWP, University of Iowa
Interview with Maxine Case on "All We Have Left Unsaid" (Kwela 2006)
Ten quick questions to Maxine Case, Litnet, 2007-04-04

South African women novelists
Writers from Cape Town
Living people
1976 births
International Writing Program alumni
21st-century South African novelists
South African women short story writers
South African short story writers
21st-century South African women writers